Ukrainian parliamentary elections determine the composition of the Verkhovna Rada for the next five years.

List of parliamentary elections 
1918 Ukrainian Constituent Assembly election
1938 Ukrainian Supreme Soviet election
1947 Ukrainian Supreme Soviet election
1951 Ukrainian Supreme Soviet election
1955 Ukrainian Supreme Soviet election
1959 Ukrainian Supreme Soviet election
1963 Ukrainian Supreme Soviet election
1967 Ukrainian Supreme Soviet election
1971 Ukrainian Supreme Soviet election
1975 Ukrainian Supreme Soviet election
1980 Ukrainian Supreme Soviet election
1985 Ukrainian Supreme Soviet election
1990 Ukrainian Supreme Soviet election
1994 Ukrainian parliamentary election
1998 Ukrainian parliamentary election
2002 Ukrainian parliamentary election
2006 Ukrainian parliamentary election
2007 Ukrainian parliamentary election
2012 Ukrainian parliamentary election
2014 Ukrainian parliamentary election
2019 Ukrainian parliamentary election
Next Ukrainian parliamentary election

See also 
 Elections in Ukraine

References